Thespesia grandiflora is a tree in the family Malvaceae of the rosids clade. Its common name is maga. This tree is widely distributed throughout Puerto Rico where it is endemic. Although originally endemic to the humid mountains of limestone in the western and north-central portions of the Island, today it grows everywhere in Puerto Rico due to its extensive cultivation. It is also grown as an ornamental tree in Florida, Hawaii, Honduras and in various Caribbean islands. The maga is mostly used as an ornamental plant, but like the related Thespesia populnea its wood is also valued for its durable timber. The flower was declared the national symbol of Puerto Rico on August 7, 2019.

Flower
The flower of the tree, known as Flor de Maga, is the official national flower of Puerto Rico. It is sometimes called a hibiscus in English, although it belongs to a different genus and species from the true hibiscus, and is more closely related to Cotton.

Growth
The maga tree usually grows no larger than 20 meters. It is grown for timber and as an ornamental plant.

References

Bibliography
 Bailey, L.H. 1941. The standard cyclopedia of horticulture. New York: Macmillan. 3,639 p.
 Calvesbert, Robert, Jr. 1970. Climate of Puerto Rico and U.S. Virgin Islands. Climatology of the United States 60-52. Silver Spring, MD: U.S. Department of Commerce, Environmental Science Service Administration, Environmental Data Service. 29 p.
 Holdridge, L.R. 1942. Trees of Puerto Rico. Occasional Paper 1. Río Piedras, PR: U.S. Department of Agriculture, Forest Service, Tropical Forest Experiment Station. 105 p. Vol. 1. 
 Holdridge, L.R. 1967. Life zone ecology. San José, Costa Rica: Tropical Science Center. 206 p.
 Joland, S.D.; Wiedhopt, R.M.; Cole, J.R. 1975. Tumor inhibitory agent from Montezuma speciosissima (Malvaceae). Journal of Pharmaceutical Sciences. 64(11): 1889-1890.
 Liogier, Henri A.; Martorell, Luis F. 1982. Flora of Puerto Rico and adjacent islands: a systematic synopsis. Río Piedras, PR: Editorial de la Universidad de Puerto Rico. 342 p.
 Little, Elbert L., Jr.; Wadsworth, Frank H. 1964. Common trees of Puerto Rico and the Virgin Islands. Agric. Handb. 249. Washington, DC: U.S. Department of Agriculture. 548 p.
 Marrero, José. 1942. A seed storage study of maga. Caribbean Forester. 3(4): 173-184.
 Marrero, José. 1947. A survey of the forest plantations in the Caribbean National Forest. Ann Arbor, MI: University of Michigan. 167 p. Tesis de M.S.
 Marrero, José. 1948. Forest planting in the Caribbean National Forest: past experience as a guide for the future. Caribbean Forester. 1: 85-213.
 Martorell, Luis F. 1975. Annotated food plant catalog of the insects of Puerto Rico. Río Piedras, PR: Agricultural Experiment Station. 303 p.
 Neal, Marie C. 1965. In gardens of Hawaii. Special Publication 50. Honolulú: Bernice P. Bishop Press. 924 p.
 Sapath, D.S.; Balaram, P. 1986. Resolution of racemic gossypol and interaction of individual enantiomers with serum albumins and model peptides. Biochimica et Biophysica Acta. 882(2): 183-186.
 Schubert, Thomas H. 1979. Trees for urban use in Puerto Rico and the Virgin Islands. Gen. Tech. Rep. SO-27. New Orleans, LA: U.S. Department of Agriculture, Forest Service, Southern Forest Experiment Station. 91 p.
 Weaver, Peter L. 1987. Tree growth in several tropical forests of Puerto Rico. Res. Pap. SO-152. New Orleans, LA: U.S. Department of Agriculture, Forest Service, Southern Forest Experiment Station. 15 p.
 Wolcott, George N. 1939. The entomologist looks at maga. Caribbean Forester. 1(1): 29-30. 
 Wolcott, George N. 1940. A list of woods arranged according to their resistance to the attack of the “polilla”, the dry-wood termite of the West Indies. Caribbean Forester. 1(4): 1-10.

External links 

Flor de maga at elboricua.com

grandiflora
Endemic flora of Puerto Rico
Flora without expected TNC conservation status